This is a list of the hills of San Francisco, California.

Prior lists
Several cities claim to have been built on seven hills. "The Seven Hills of San Francisco" are Telegraph Hill, Nob Hill, Russian Hill, Rincon Hill, Twin Peaks, Mount Davidson and Lone Mountain or Mount Sutro.

The origin of most longer lists of San Francisco hills is Hills of San Francisco, a compilation of 42 San Francisco Chronicle columns, each describing one of the city's hills. The "Hills" chapter of Gladys Hansen's San Francisco Almanac repeated the list given in Hills of San Francisco and added the then-recently-named Cathedral Hill for a total of 43, but the "Places" chapter listed many additional hills. More recent lists include more hills, some lesser-known, some not on the mainland, and some without names.

Map

Hills

See also

 List of San Francisco placename etymologies
 List of summits of the San Francisco Bay Area
 Neighborhoods in San Francisco

References

External links
 "High on a Hill: Hills of the City", MisterSF.com
 "Seven Hells of SF: The road to hell is paved with potholes",  San Francisco Bay Guardian 2008-Jun-30

 
 
Hills
Hills